The 2010 China Open Super Series was a top level badminton competition which was held from 30 November–5 December 2010 at the Yuanshen Gymnasium in Shanghai, China. It was the eleventh BWF Super Series competition on the 2010 BWF Super Series schedule. The total purse for the event was $250,000.

Men's singles

Top half

Bottom half

Finals

Women's singles

Top half

Bottom half

Finals

Men's doubles

Top half

Bottom half

Finals

Women's doubles

Top half

Bottom half

Finals

Mixed doubles

Top half

Bottom half

Finals

References

External links
China Super Series 2010 at tournamentsoftware.com

2010
Open Super Series
China Open